The Hartford Hurricanes were an American basketball team based in Hartford, Connecticut that was a member of the American Basketball League.

The team was previously known as the Elizabeth Braves who moved to Hartford during the 1947/48 season on December 19, 1947.

Notable coaches

Tubby Raskin (1902–1981), basketball player and coach

References

Hurricanes
Defunct basketball teams in Connecticut
American Basketball League (1925–1955) teams
Basketball teams established in 1947
Basketball teams disestablished in 1950